Boehmeria japonica is a species of flowering plant in the nettle family (Urticaceae). It native to eastern Asia, where it is found in China, Japan, South Korea, and Taiwan. 

Its natural habitat is extremely variable, being found in areas that range from wet to dry, and from shaded to open. It is tolerant of disturbance, and can be found growing on walls and roadsides. It is considered to be a common species in most of Japan.

Description
It is perennial subshrub or herb, growing to 5 m in height. Its leaves are dark green, ovate, and with upwardly-curving teeth. It produces small green flowers in the summer.

Taxonomy
Boehmeria japonica is a highly morphologically variable species across it range, due to the presence of both apomixis and polyploidy. Numerous segregates have named in attempts to taxonomically describe this variation. In the most recent treatment of the complex, three integrating varieties are recognized. They are:
B. japonica var. japonica- with spreading pubescence, leaves larger and thicker-textured; found in warmer areas.
B. japonica var. silvestrii -leaves glabrous or appressed-pubescent; leaves thin, wide, with three elongated teeth; uncommon.
B. japonica var. tenera - leaves glabrous or appressed-pubescent; leaves thin, narrow, and with a single long terminal tooth; common.

Uses
It is used for making ropes and cloth, as agricultural fodder, and medicinally to relieve fever.

References

japonica
Taxa named by Friedrich Anton Wilhelm Miquel